In coding theory, the  Wozencraft ensemble is a set of linear codes in which most of codes satisfy the Gilbert-Varshamov bound. It is named after John Wozencraft, who proved its existence.

Existence theorem

Theorem: Let  For a large enough , there exists an ensemble of inner codes  of rate , where , such that for at least  values of  has relative distance .

Here relative distance is the ratio of minimum distance to block length. And  is the q-ary entropy function defined as follows:

This ensemble is due to Wozencraft and is called the Wozencraft ensemble.

For all , we have the following facts:
 
 For any 

So  is a linear code for every .

Now we know that Wozencraft ensemble contains linear codes with rate . In the following proof, we will show that there are at least  those linear codes having the relative distance , i.e. they meet the Gilbert-Varshamov bound.

Proof

To prove that there are at least  number of linear codes in the Wozencraft ensemble having relative distance , we will prove that there are at most  number of linear codes having relative distance  i.e., having distance 

Notice that in a linear code, the distance is equal to the minimum weight of all codewords of that code. This fact is the property of linear code. So if one non-zero codeword has weight , then that code has distance 

Let  be the set of linear codes having distance  Then there are  linear codes having some codeword that has weight 

Lemma.

Proof.

Any linear code having distance  has some codeword of weight  Now the Lemma implies that we have at least  different  such that  (one such codeword  for each linear code).

Denote

Then:

So , therefore the set of linear codes having the relative distance  has at least  elements.

See also
 Justesen code
 Linear code
 Hamming bound

References

.
.

External links
 Lecture 28: Justesen Code. Coding theory's course. Prof. Atri Rudra.
 Lecture 9: Bounds on the Volume of a Hamming Ball. Coding theory's course. Prof. Atri Rudra.
 
 Coding Theory's Notes: Gilbert-Varshamov Bound. Venkatesan Guruswami

Error detection and correction